Belfast International Arts Festival, formerly known as Belfast Festival at Queen’s, claims to be the city’s longest running international arts event.

Originally established in 1962, it was hosted by Queen’s University until 2015, after which a new independent organisation (a company limited by guarantee and registered as a charity) was formed. The event covers theatre, dance, classical and roots music, visual, film and digital arts and literature accompanied by outreach and education events. It takes place every October in venues and locations across Belfast.

History

Held annually, usually in October/November, the festival was founded by student Michael Emmerson in 1962.

From small beginnings the festival grew through the 1960s and 1970s, expanding to a two-week-long event. Performers during this time included Jimi Hendrix, Richard Stilgoe, Laurence Olivier, Rowan Atkinson and Billy Connolly.

The festival is held at several venues across the city, including The MAC, Ulster Hall, the Naughton Gallery, the Queen's Film Theatre, the Brian Friel Theatre and the Whitla Hall at Queen's, as well as the Grand Opera House, the Waterfront Hall and An Chultúrlann arts centre.

Funding crisis
In January 2007, sufficient funding was not in place to ensure that the 2007 festival would go ahead, and the university launched a 'Save Belfast Festival' campaign, encouraging people to petition Maria Eagle MP, then minister responsible for cultural activities in Northern Ireland. The campaign received support from the Belfast Telegraph and celebrities including Patrick Kielty. On 16 February 2007 the Minister announced a £150,000 one-off payment to the Belfast Festival at Queen's, although the campaign to raise more funds continued throughout the year. The university subsequently announced that the 2007 festival would go ahead, albeit on a reduced scale, but that work is still required to secure its long-term future.

Sponsorship
>

This funding came to an end in 2016 when the Ulster Bank announced its withdrawal from the funding of the much-diminished festival.

See also
Belfast Film Festival
Brian Friel Theatre
Cathedral Quarter Arts Festival
Féile an Phobail
Queen's Film Theatre

References

External links
Official Website
Save Belfast Festival

Arts festivals in Northern Ireland
Music festivals in Northern Ireland
Queen's University Belfast
Theatre in Northern Ireland
Festivals in Belfast
1962 establishments in Northern Ireland
Music festivals established in 1962
Annual events in Northern Ireland
Autumn events in Northern Ireland